Ambarapola is a village of Udunuwara Electorate in Kandy Electoral District, Sri Lanka.

Populated places in Kandy District